Vijayawada Junction railway station (station code:- BZA) is an Indian Railways station in Vijayawada of Andhra Pradesh, categorized as a Non-Suburban Grade-2 (NSG-2) station in Vijayawada railway division. The station serves about  passengers, over 190 express and 170 freight trains every day. It is one of the major railway junctions of the Indian Railways and is a nationally important halt.

History 

The Vijayawada city junction railway station was constructed in 1888 when the Southern Maharatta Railway's main eastward route was connected with other lines going through Vijayawada. In 1889, the Nizam's Guaranteed State Railway constructed a line between Secunderabad railway station and Vijayawada as an extension railway for Bezawada; the station subsequently became a junction of three lines from different directions.

On 1 November 1899, the broad-gauge line was constructed between Vijayawada and Chennai, making rail journey between Chennai, Mumbai,  and Hyderabad possible. In the following decades the Vijayawada railway station was developed into a junction until the nationalisation of all the independent railways in India occurred; following nationalisation, Indian Railways was formed under the Ministry of Railways in 1950 by the Government of India. The Vijayawada railway station, as the headquarters of Vijayawada Division, was assigned to the Southern Railway.

In 1969, the Golconda Express was introduced between Vijayawada and Secunderabad as the express steam-hauled train in the country, with an average speed of 58 km/h. As of 2012, the Vijayawada railway station is one of the busiest railway stations in India.

Layout and infrastructure 

Vijayawada station has the standard station layout, and has 10 platforms. All the tracks in the station are broad gauge and electrified. Trains have perfect traction inside the station. The seventh platform of the station is the largest of all. Vijayawada station is a junction station for two main lines of Howrah–Chennai and New Delhi–Chennai main lines.

In the FY 2009, the Indian Railways Company board allocated  for improvements to the transport hub. A central aspect of the improvements was an "Integrated Security Scheme" which included construction of a compound wall around the station premises and a reduction in the number of entrances as a precaution against terrorism. SCR recently installed Automatic Ticket Vending Machines (ATVM)s at Vijayawada Junction. Recently the engineering department officials have completed a circuit lighting area near the station main entrance. A 490 metre long and 20 feet wide foot over bridge is constructed connecting platforms 1 to 10 which will help passengers to walk less. Cost of project is estimated to be 2 crores.

The Vijayawada Junction also houses a Diesel Loco Shed which has the WDM-2 Locomotive and DEMU Shed with 2 Pit lines which have a 10, 9 DEMU Coaches Capacity also BZA have an Electric Loco Shed, Vijayawada which has the WAG-7, WAM-4(now scrapped or withdrawn), WAG-5 WAP-4WAP-7 locos.

The Vijayawada station was now arranged with a new Route Relay Interlocking system which returns the fast and punctual movement of trains into the city junction.

Vijayawada Coaching Depot has 5 pit lines for primary maintenance of trains originating from here.Satavahana Express, Ratnachal Express, Pinakini Express, Vijayawada–Lingampalli Intercity Express, Vijayawada-Gudur Intercity Express, Amaravati Express, Vijayawada–Dharmavaram Express, Sainagar Shirdi–Vijayawada Express are maintained here.

Originating express trains

Halting trains 

SF - Super Fast; Jn. - Junction; BG - Broad Gauge;

Satellite stations 
The Vijayawada station one satellite station in order to reduce the congestion on the main station. It is:

 Rayanapadu on the Vijayawada - New Delhi Line. Some trains running in the route Warangal - Gudivada Jn/Eluru halt here instead of Vijaywada Jn. to reduce the congesting at the station. Halting at Rayanapadu instead of Vijayawada Jn. would also avoid the train reversal for those trains.

Performance and earnings 

An average of  passengers are served per day and  annually. More than 250 passenger trains and 150 goods trains utilize the station daily, with each train stopping for at least 15 to 20 minutes.

See also 

 List of railway stations in India

References

External links 

 South Central Railway
 

Railway stations in Krishna district
Railway stations in India opened in 1888
Transport in Vijayawada
Vijayawada railway division
Buildings and structures in Vijayawada
Railway junction stations in Andhra Pradesh